Cornelis Pijnacker Hordijk (13 April 1847 – 3 September 1908) was a Dutch jurist and politician. He was Governor-General of the Dutch East Indies from 1888 until 1893.

References

External links 
 

1847 births
1908 deaths
Dutch jurists
Governors-General of the Dutch East Indies
Members of the Senate (Netherlands)
People from Tiel
Academic staff of the University of Amsterdam
Utrecht University alumni
Academic staff of Utrecht University
Commanders of the Order of the Netherlands Lion
Grand Officers of the Order of Orange-Nassau